Girly Anto, credited by her screen name Gopika (born 1 February 1984) is an Indian actress, who has predominantly starred in Malayalam films.Starting her career as a model, she ventured into acting with the Malayalam film, Pranayamanithooval , directed by Thulasidas,  opposite Jayasurya and Vineeth Kumar in 2002. She also acted in the Tamil, Telugu and Kannada film industries as well.

Early life

Gopika was born Girly Anto into a Syro Malabar Catholic family, to Anto Francis and Tessy Anto of Ollur in Thrissur, Kerala. She has a younger sister, Glini. After completing her education to the 12th Standard (Year 12) at St. Raphael's Convent Girls High School, Ollur, she studied for a degree in sociology at Calicut University. She also learnt classical dance from an acclaimed teacher, Kamalher, and she was crowned 'Miss College' during her farewell ceremony at the college. The beauty contest 'Miss Thrissur' was a turning point in her life. Though she did not win the title, she stood as the runner-up in the contest, which gained her a few modeling assignments. She claims that she never wanted to be an actress, and her ambition was actually to be an air-hostess.

Career

Her first film was Pranayamanithooval, in which she starred with Jayasurya and Vineeth under the direction of Thulasi Das, did not do well, but it got her recognition in the industry. Her second film, 4 the People, was a blockbuster and was dubbed in many Indian languages. It was directed by Jayaraj, and she acted opposite Tamil actor Bharath. The song "Lejjavathiye Ninde Kalla Kadaikkannil" from the film was a big hit in Kerala. Renowned Tamil movie director Cheran signed her up for his film Autograph, which was another big hit in 2004. She also acted in Kana Kandaen (2005).

Among her other work, she has acted in Kannada film Kanasina Loka and the Telugu remake of Azhagi, Leta Manasulu, which crashed at the box office. She starred in the Malayalam movie Keerthi Chakra opposite Jiiva. Directed by Major Ravi, the movie tells the story of a soldier against the backdrop of the Kargil war. Apart from Keerthi Chakra, she did another movie with Dileep: Pachakuthira. Her previous film with Dileep, Chanthupottu, was a big hit. Veruthe Oru Bharya was a phenomenal hit, and it gained her the Asianet Best Actress award of 2008. Sreeja has been providing her voice since the first movie. Devi has voiced in the last three films and Vimmy Mariam George in Smart City.

Personal life

On 17 July 2008, Gopika married Ajilesh Chacko, a doctor working in Northern Ireland. They have a daughter and a son.

The family then moved to Brisbane, Australia and has settled there.

Awards

 2004 – Asianet Best Supporting Actress Award – Vesham
 2006 – Asianet Best Star Pair Award – Keerthi Chakra (shared with Jiiva )
 2009 – Asianet Best Actress Award – Veruthe Oru Bharya
 2008 – Vanitha Film Awards for Best Actress – Veruthe Oru Bharya
 2008 - Nominated - Filmfare Award for Best Actress – Malayalam – Veruthe Oru Bharya
 2009 - Nominated - Filmfare Award for Best Actress – Malayalam – Swantham Lekhakan

Filmography

References

External links
 

1984 births
Living people
Indian film actresses
Actresses from Thrissur
21st-century Indian actresses
St. Raphael's Convent Girls High School alumni
Actresses in Malayalam cinema
Actresses in Tamil cinema
Actresses in Telugu cinema
Actresses in Kannada cinema
Indian emigrants to Australia